Eero Neemre (until 1936 Ernst Nüssik; 22 March 1905 Ropka Parish, Tartu County – 28 September 1994 Viljandi) was an Estonian theatre actor and theatre director.

In 1926 he graduated from Lulu Kitzberg-Pappel's Theatre School. 1928 he worked at Tartu Töölisteater (since 1930 its artistic leader). 1932-1940 he worked at Vanemuine theatre in Tartu. From 1943 until 1991, he worked at Ugala theatre in Viljandi and was the theatre's principal artistic director from 1943 until 1945.

Awards
 1967: Meritorious Artist of the Estonian SSR
 1970: Honorary Letter of the Presidium of the Supreme Soviet of the Estonian SSR
 1979: Estonian SSR Theatre Association Prize

Productions of plays

 Antson's "Lapsed" (1929)
 Raudsepp's "Mikumärdi" (1930)
 Voltaire's "Metsmees" (1932)

References

1905 births
1994 deaths
Estonian male stage actors
20th-century Estonian male actors
Estonian theatre directors
People from Kambja Parish